William L. McCall (March 14, 1898 - July 12, 1943) was a pitcher in Negro league baseball. He played for the Pittsburgh Keystones, Cleveland Tate Stars, Birmingham Black Barons, Kansas City Monarchs, Chicago American Giants, Indianapolis ABCs, and Detroit Stars from 1922 to 1931.

References

External links
 and Baseball-Reference Black Baseball stats and Seamheads
 

Year of birth missing
Year of death missing
Pittsburgh Keystones players
Birmingham Black Barons players
Cleveland Tate Stars players
Kansas City Monarchs players
Chicago American Giants players
Indianapolis ABCs players
Detroit Stars players
Baseball players from Columbus, Georgia
Baseball pitchers